The Caproni Ca.16 was a single-engine monoplane designed and built by Caproni in the early 1910s.

Design
The Caproni Ca.16 was a single-engine, two seat monoplane with a modern configuration, with elica traente. It was derived from the Ca.15, in turn based on the structure – initially derived from that of Blériot XI – that Gianni Caproni had introduced for the first time aboard his airplanes to starting with  Ca.8, after the experiments carried out with the series of biplanes from the Ca.1 to the Ca.6Aeroplani Caproni – Gianni Caproni ideatore e costruttore di ali italiane

The Ca.16 was realized in 1912. It presented the two separated and spaced places, as on the Ca.14 (while on Ca.15 they were very close and accessible through a single opening at the top of fuselage). On Ca.16 it was possible for the first pilot to arm or disengage the commands of the second pilot (or passenger).

Operational use

Closed-circuit records
The operational history of Caproni Ca.16 is largely linked to the figure of the pilot  Russian Chariton Nikanorovič Slavorossov. He had presented himself to Vizzola Ticino, where at that time the workshops of Caproni and Faccanoni were located, in January 1913, to buy a propeller for his Blériot. Caproni already knew the skills of this pilot, who had seen flying to Vienna in 1912. He offered him a pilot test place, which Slavorossov accepted. On 24 January, on board a Ca.16, he beat the world record on a closed circuit of 5 km with passenger, covering 200 km in 1 h 56 '30'' and 250 km in 2 h 24' 30''.

The Milan-Rome raid
On 23 February 1913, with the intention (colored in tones patriotic, or even nationalistic) to give an impulse to the Italian aeronautic industry, the vice president of the Italian aviation company Luigi Origoni and the general secretary of the Italian Touring Club and collaborator of the La Gazzetta dello Sport Arturo Mercanti decided to give away a prize for the first flight from Milan to Rome made with an Italian aircraft.

Specifications

See also 
 Giovanni Battista Caproni
 Museo dell'Aeronautica Gianni Caproni

References

Ca.016
Aircraft first flown in 1912
Experimental aircraft
Rotary-engined aircraft